This is a list of learned societies in Australia.

References

 
Learned societies